"State of My Head" is a song by American rock band Shinedown. It was released on October 9, 2015 as the second single from the band's fifth studio album, Threat to Survival. The song reached number one on the Billboard Mainstream Rock chart, their tenth single to do so.

Style
James Chrisopher at AllMusic described the song as a departure from post-grunge, finding it to be a "slick amalgam of electropop and vintage alternative rock".

Media
"State of My Head" was the theme song for the Professional Bull Riders' Built Ford Tough Series telecasts on CBS and CBS Sports Network during the PBR's 2016 season.

Charts

Weekly charts

Year-end charts

Certifications

References

2015 singles
Shinedown songs
2015 songs
Atlantic Records singles
Songs written by Brent Smith